Oliver Mueller competed for Germany in the men's standing volleyball events at the 1992 Summer Paralympics, the 1996 Summer Paralympics, and the 2000 Summer Paralympics. He won gold medals in 1992, 1996, and 2000.

See also 
 Germany at the 1992 Summer Paralympics
 Germany at the 1996 Summer Paralympics
 Germany at the 2000 Summer Paralympics

References 

Living people
Year of birth missing (living people)
Place of birth missing (living people)
German men's volleyball players
Paralympic gold medalists for Germany
Paralympic medalists in volleyball
Volleyball players at the 1992 Summer Paralympics
Volleyball players at the 1996 Summer Paralympics
Volleyball players at the 2000 Summer Paralympics
Medalists at the 1992 Summer Paralympics
Medalists at the 1996 Summer Paralympics
Medalists at the 2000 Summer Paralympics
Paralympic volleyball players of Germany